Yousef Nasser Al-Sulaiman (born 9 October 1990) is a Kuwaiti professional footballer who plays as a forward for Kuwaiti Premier League club Qadsiya SC.

International goals
Scores and results list Kuwait's goal tally first.

Honours
Kazma Sporting Club
 Kuwait Emir Cup: 2011
 Kuwait Federation Cup: 2015–16

Kuwait
 WAFF Championship: 2010
 Gulf Cup of Nations: 2010

References

External links

1990 births
Living people
Kuwaiti footballers
Kuwaiti expatriate footballers
Kuwait international footballers
Association football forwards
Kazma SC players
Ajman Club players
Al-Nahda Club (Oman) players
Qadsia SC players
Kuwait SC players
Kuwait Premier League players
UAE Pro League players
Oman Professional League players
2011 AFC Asian Cup players
2015 AFC Asian Cup players
Sportspeople from Kuwait City
Expatriate footballers in the United Arab Emirates
Expatriate footballers in Oman
Kuwaiti expatriate sportspeople in the United Arab Emirates
Kuwaiti expatriate sportspeople in Oman
FIFA Century Club